Saint Tysul was a 5th-century pre-canonical saint and patron saint of the churches of Llandysul in Ceredigion (Cardiganshire)  and Llandyssil in Maldwyn (Montgomeryshire), Powys. Tysul’s full name was Tysul ap Corun ap Cunedda – or son of Corun, son of Cunedda. His feast day is 31 January.

Life
His full name was Tysul ap Corun ap Cunedda – or in English Tysul son of Corun, son of Cunedda and he was born around 462 AD.

He died in 554 and today he is remembered in the church of Llandyssil, and the 13th-century church of Llandysul in Ceredigion.

Tysul's Church

Tysul built a church in Llandyssil, Powys. It was located on a hillside to the south east of the village. and today its remains are still within a roughly circular graveyard, which is still in use.

The south porch is the only surviving part of St. Tysul's church, which was replaced in 1866 by a new church on the north west side of the village. His church was renowned for its timber belfry, and there was strong contemporary feeling against its demolition and replacement.

Gallery

References

Medieval Welsh saints
6th-century Christian saints
6th-century births
Roman Catholic monks
Year of birth unknown
Year of death unknown
6th-century Christian monks
6th-century Welsh people
Welsh hermits